James Calhoun Adkins Jr. (January 18, 1915 – June 24, 1994). Adkins was a former justice for the Florida Supreme Court.

He was a judge from the U.S. state of Florida.  James Adkins served on the Florida Supreme Court from 1969 - 1987. From 1974 to 1976 Adkins served as chief justice.

Adkins graduated from the University of Florida College of Law in 1938 and was a member of Florida Blue Key. While on the Florida Supreme Court he dealt with student anti-war demonstrations in the 1960s, and reapportionment of the state of Florida in the 1970s.

References

1915 births
Chief Justices of the Florida Supreme Court
1994 deaths
20th-century American judges
Fredric G. Levin College of Law alumni